Bott is an English and German surname. Notable people with the surname include:

Catherine Bott, English soprano
Charlie Bott, English rugby player
François Bott (born 1935) 
John Bott
Leon Bott, Australian rugby league footballer
Leonidas Bott (1889–1969), Australian cricketer
Lloyd Bott (1917–2004), senior Australian public servant
Mark Bott, English cricketer
Markus Bott (born 1962), German boxer
Martin Bott, English geophysicist
Nina Bott (born 1978), German actress
Randy L. Bott
Raoul Bott, mathematician
Richard Bott
Violet Elizabeth Bott the character in a Richmal Crompton novel.
Wilf Bott

See also
Atiyah–Bott fixed-point theorem
Borel–Weil–Bott theorem
Bott periodicity theorem
Bott residue formula
Bot (disambiguation)

English-language surnames
German-language surnames